D. Aaron Riches (born 1974) is a Canadian theologian at Benedictine College in Atchison, Kansas. He was previously a theologian for the Seminario Mayor San Cecilio in Granada, Spain, and joint faculty member of the International Academy of Philosophy-Instituto de Filosofía "Edith Stein" and the Instituto de Teología "Lumen Gentium".  He is widely published in the fields of systematic theology and Christology. His recent book, Ecce Homo: On the Divine Unity of Christ, questions the tendency to distinguish between the human and divine natures of Christ to such a degree as to oppose them.

Prior to his academic career, Riches was a Canadian singer-songwriter. He was in the bands Left Hand Red, Curtsy, Fiddle Footed, Burn 51 and Minnow. Afterwards, he released two solo albums and toured with the Royal City All-Stars, which eventually became the band Royal City, which has also since disbanded.

Riches is originally from Guelph, Ontario, and is the subject of the Robert Munsch children's book Aaron's Hair.

Works

Discography
 Over the Light Post (1995)
 Rain (1997)

In Royal City
 At Rush Hour the Cars (2001)
 Alone at the Microphone (2002)
 Little Heart's Ease (2004)
 Royal City (2009)

References

1974 births
20th-century Canadian guitarists
20th-century Canadian male singers
21st-century Canadian guitarists
21st-century Christian theologians
Academics in Ontario
Alumni of the University of Nottingham
Canadian Christian theologians
Canadian male guitarists
Canadian male singer-songwriters
Canadian singer-songwriters
Canadian rock singers
Christologists
Living people
Musicians from Guelph
Systematic theologians
University of Virginia alumni
York University alumni
21st-century Canadian male singers